The Romanian Cultural Foundation is a Romanian non-governmental organization created in 1990 by writer Augustin Buzura, with the objective of stimulating cultural, artistic and scientific creations, promoting Romanian spiritual values in Romania and abroad, and fostering inter-cultural dialogue.

In 2003 it has been reorganized under the newly established Romanian Cultural Institute.

In 2004 it has been re-established as a private foundation with the same name. The foundation continues the work of the original Romanian Cultural Foundation (1990-2003).

External links
 Further details

Cultural organizations based in Romania